Leaf River is a village in Leaf River Township, Ogle County, Illinois, United States, along a stream of the same name. The population was 443 at the 2010 census, down from 555 in 2000.

Geography

Leaf River is located at  (42.126350, -89.402976).

Demographics

As of the census of 2000, there were 555 people, 214 households, and 154 families residing in the village. The racial makeup of the village was 98.20% White, 1.62% African American and 0.18% Native American. Hispanic or Latino of any race were 0.72% of the population.

There were 214 households, out of which 32.7% had children under the age of 18 living with them, 58.9% were married couples living together, 9.8% had a female householder with no husband present, and 28.0% were non-families. 21.5% of all households were made up of individuals, and 5.1% had someone living alone who was 65 years of age or older. The average household size was 2.59 and the average family size was 3.07.

In the village, the population was spread out, with 26.5% under the age of 18, 8.1% from 18 to 24, 29.5% from 25 to 44, 23.2% from 45 to 64, and 12.6% who were 65 years of age or older. The median age was 35 years. For every 100 females, there were 92.7 males. For every 100 females age 18 and over, there were 95.2 males.

The median income for a household in the village was $36,528, and the median income for a family was $40,268. Males had a median income of $33,958 versus $21,000 for females. The per capita income for the village was $15,620. About 2.5% of families and 5.7% of the population were below the poverty line, including 3.1% of those under age 18 and 7.6% of those age 65 or over.

Facilities
The village is the home of Camp Kupugani, a private multicultural summer camp for boys and girls.

References

Villages in Ogle County, Illinois
Villages in Illinois
Populated places established in 1882